Lumphanan railway station, Lumphanan, Aberdeenshire, Scotland stood from 1859 to 1966 on the Deeside Railway that ran from Aberdeen (Joint) to Ballater. It served the village of Lumphanan, Aberdeenshire, famous for its associations with Macbeth and King Malcolm III. It stood close to the Macbeth Arms Hotel.

History 
The station was opened in 1859 on the Deeside branch by the Aboyne Extension Railway and at first its services were operated by the Deeside Railway.  Later it became part of the GnoSR and at grouping merged with the London and North Eastern Railway. It stood 27 miles (43.5 km) from Aberdeen and 16 miles (25.5 km) from Ballater. It was closed to passengers on 28 February 1966. The line has been lifted and sections form part of the Deeside Way long-distance footpath.

The name Lumphanan comes from the Gaelic and means 'Church of St Finnan'.

Infrastructure

The station had a passing loop installed in 1892 and then two stone built platforms standing on a slightly curved section of this single track portion of the branchline. The ticket office, toilets and waiting room were situated on the up platform, consisting of a rough-cast and brick built single-storey structure, with round-headed windows at the front and a central covered area. The shelter on the down platform was a typical GNoSR design with wooden slatted sides and at the eastern end of this platform stood the signal box. A pedestrian footbridge linked the platforms and a road overbridge stood at the western end of the station.

A large stone built goods shed was provided, served by a siding that also served a loading dock; another siding ran parallel to it and a final siding ran behind the down platform. Several small storage huts sat near the goods shed. A weighing machine was located near the road entrance.

A short siding off the passing loop on the eastbound side was built as a precaution against waggons that might break loose from freight trains struggling up the steep ascent to Satan's Den Cutting. After a train had left the point was switched to ensure the safety of trains heading up from Aboyne.

Two station houses for the station master, etc. were built to the south of the goods yard.

Services
The line was chosen to trial the battery multiple unit and once introduced on 21 April 1958 the train service was doubled to six trains a day and in addition a Sunday service was reinstated.

The site today 
The platform and station buildings have been demolished however the name 'Station Square' survives.  The Royal Deeside Railway is located at Milton of Crathes some distance down the line towards Aberdeen. The two station houses are still present.

References

Sources
 
 Johnston, James B. (1934). Place-Names of Scotland. London : John Murray.
 Maxtone, Graham and Cooper, Mike (2018). Then and Now on the Great North. V.1. GNoSR Association. .

External links 
Video footage of Lumphanan district
Film of the station and the Deeside line.
RailScot - Lumphanan Station 

Disused railway stations in Aberdeenshire
Beeching closures in Scotland
Former Great North of Scotland Railway stations
Railway stations in Great Britain opened in 1859
Railway stations in Great Britain closed in 1966
1966 disestablishments in Scotland